Kualoa is a  private nature reserve and working cattle ranch, as well as a popular tourist attraction and filming location on the windward coast of Oahu in Hawaii. The ranch consists of 3 valleys: Kaaawa Valley, Kualoa Valley, and Hakipuu Valley. The ranch is located on Hawaii State Route 83 between Kaaawa and Waikane. The main street address is 49-560 Kamehameha Highway, Kāneohe, Hawaii 96744.

History 

The valley was sacred to ancient Hawaiians from the 13th to the 18th century, as Chief Laa-mai-kahiki settled there after visiting Kauai before returning to Tahiti.  It was also the site of the sacred drums of Kapahuula and Kaahuulapunawai as well as the sacred Hill of Kauakahiakahoowaha, the key to the sovereignty of the Kingdom of Oahu.  As written in the Kumulipo, an ancient Hawaiian genealogical chant, Kualoa is where Papa and Wakea buried their first still born child, Haloa. It is said that the first kalo (taro) plant grew up from where Haloa was buried at Kualoa.

In 1850 an American doctor and missionary Dr. Gerrit P. Judd purchased 622 acres of ranch land at Kualoa for $1300, and also the island of Mokolii just offshore, from King Kamehameha III. Dr. Judd was the first person to translate medical journals into the Hawaiian language for King Kamehameha and so the king was very grateful for his works.  In 1860 Dr. Judd bought a further 2200 acres. Then in 1880 Dr. Judd's son Charles bought another 1188 acres. Today there are about 4000 acres of land.

In 1863 Charles Judd and his brother-in-law Samuel Gardner Wilder started a sugarcane plantation and built a sugar mill at the ranch.  Several years of low rainfall brought sugar farming to a close, and the mill closed in 1870.  The ruins of the old sugar mill can still be seen along Kamehameha Highway.

In 1941 during World War II, the U.S. military occupied the land, which became the site of Kualoa Airfield.  After the war the ranch was returned to the Morgan family, the owners and descendants of Dr. Judd.

The entire ahupuaa (traditional land division of ancient Hawaii) was added to the National Register of Historic Places listings in Oahu as the Kualoa Ahupuaa Historical District, site 74000718 on October 16, 1974.

From 1993 to 1998, the ranch hosted Hawaii's first major rock festival, the Big Mele, since the Diamond Head Crater Festivals held on New Years Day from 1969 to 1978.

Activities 

The property continues to be a working cattle ranch and is run by John Morgan from the island of Hawaii. Kualoa is open for guided tours and tours on horseback.

In 2018, the ranch was raising shrimp and making it available, as local lunch cuisine, to visitors.

In popular culture
More than 79 movies and TV shows have been filmed at Kualoa over the years, including Paradise, Hawaiian Style, Jurassic Park, Jurassic World, Mighty Joe Young, 50 First Dates, You, Me and Dupree, Hawaii Five-0, Magnum P.I., Pearl Harbor, Windtalkers, Godzilla, Kong: Skull Island, Jumanji, Jumanji: Welcome to the Jungle, Snatched, and Lost.

The Secret Island, located within the ranch, served as the Finish Line for The Amazing Race 20, which aired on May 6, 2012. A few months later, Secret Island appeared as the site of a Pit Stop on the French version of The Amazing Race.

See also
Hawaii Film Office
Francis S. Morgan

References

External links
Hawaii Film Office interview article with Terence Chang, producer of Windtalkers
Kualoa Ranch Official website
Sunset Ranch Menus Ranch Menus

Buildings and structures in Honolulu County, Hawaii
Ranches in Hawaii
Tourist attractions in Honolulu County, Hawaii
1860 establishments in Hawaii
National Register of Historic Places in Honolulu County, Hawaii